Yushan Nijiati (Үсен Нижат born June 1, 1986) is a Chinese amateur boxer of Kazakh ancestry best known for winning the bronze medal at the 2007 World Championships in the 201 lb/91 kg division.

Career
He lost to eventual winner Clemente Russo on points in the semifinal. He qualified for the 2008 Olympics in his native country at Heavyweight but lost his first bout to Oleksandr Usyk 3-24.

External links 
 BEIJING 2008 OLYMPIC GAMES CHINESE SPORTS DELEGATION ROSTER
 

1986 births
Living people
Boxers at the 2008 Summer Olympics
Heavyweight boxers
Olympic boxers of China
Sportspeople from Xinjiang
People from Altay Prefecture
Chinese male boxers
Chinese people of Kazakhstani descent
Kazakhs in China
AIBA World Boxing Championships medalists